Geeta Koda is an Indian politician and a member of Indian National Congress and a Member of Parliament from Singhbhum Lok Sabha constituency. Earlier she was associated with Jai Bharat Samanta Party.

Political career
Koda is a member of the Jharkhand Legislative Assembly from the Jaganathpur constituency in West Singhbhum district. She is an ethnic Ho, a scheduled tribe. She is married to Madhu Koda, the former Chief Minister of Jharkhand.

In February 2017, Koda was appointed a member of the Commonwealth Women Parliamentarians Steering Committee (India Region) by Sumitra Mahajan, Speaker of the Lok Sabha.

Awards and honors 
Champions of Change Award in 2019, for her work in Social Welfare (Aspirational Districts). The award was conferred by Shri Pranab Mukherjee at Vigyan Bhavan New Delhi on 20 January 2020.

References

Year of birth missing (living people)
Living people
Adivasi women
People from East Singhbhum district
India MPs 2019–present
Indian National Congress politicians from Jharkhand
Jharkhand MLAs 2009–2014
Jharkhand MLAs 2014–2019
Women members of the Jharkhand Legislative Assembly
Women members of the Lok Sabha
21st-century Indian women politicians